Kışlaköy Coal Mine is a lignite mine in Elbistan coalfield and is the largest operating lignite mine in Turkey.

References

External links 

 coal mines in Turkey on Global Energy Monitor

Coal mines in Turkey
Kahramanmaraş Province
Elbistan